Jessie Hicks (born December 2, 1971) is a former professional basketball player. She was chosen to be a member of the 2013 ACC Women's Basketball Tournament Legends Roster, a class of 12 former-student-athlete,s who represent three decades of basketball.

Personal life
Hicks earned a degree in criminal justice in 1993. She later earned a master's of education in guidance and counseling. She has two children.

References

External links
Jessie Hicks WNBA Stats | Basketball-Reference.com
Legends

1971 births
Living people
Basketball players from Richmond, Virginia
Centers (basketball)
Connecticut Sun players
Forwards (basketball)
Maryland Terrapins women's basketball players
Orlando Miracle players
San Antonio Stars players
Utah Starzz draft picks
Utah Starzz players